Ilona Mokronowska (born 11 June 1972 in Poznań) is a Polish lightweight rower.

External links 
 
 

1972 births
Living people
Polish female rowers
Sportspeople from Poznań
Rowers at the 2000 Summer Olympics
Rowers at the 2004 Summer Olympics
Olympic rowers of Poland
World Rowing Championships medalists for Poland
European Rowing Championships medalists